Midlands 1 West is an English level 6 rugby union regional league for rugby clubs in the western region of the Midlands, including sides from Herefordshire, Shropshire, Staffordshire, Warwickshire, Birmingham and the West Midlands, Worcestershire and occasionally Cheshire, Derbyshire, Leicestershire and Oxfordshire.  When this division began in 1987 it was known as Midlands 2 West, and has been restructured several times, most notably as a single division known as Midlands 2 between 1992 and 2000, before regionalising again to its present format.  

The league champions are promoted to Midlands Premier and the runner-up play against the second placed team from Midlands 1 East for the second promotion place. The bottom three teams are relegated to Midlands 2 West (North) or Midlands 2 West (South) depending on geographical location.

2021–22
The teams competing in 2021–22 achieved their places in the league based on performances in 2019–20, the 'previous season' column in the table below refers to that season not 2020–21.

2020–21
On 30 October 2020 the RFU announced  that due to the coronavirus pandemic a decision had been taken to cancel Adult Competitive Leagues (National League 1 and below) for the 2020/21 season meaning Midlands 1 West was not contested.

Teams 2019–20

Teams 2018–19

Teams 2017–18

2016-17
Bournville 
Burton 
Crewe & Nantwich
Dudley Kingswinford
Hereford
Kenilworth
Moseley Oak (promoted from Midlands 2 West (North))
Newport (Salop) (relegated from National League 3 Midlands)
Stoke-on-Trent
Stratford upon Avon
Sutton Coldfield (relegated from National League 3 Midlands)
Whitchurch
Wolverhampton (promoted from Midlands 2 West (North))
Worcester Wanderers

2015–16

Participating teams and locations

2014–15
Barkers Butts
Berkswell & Balsall
Crewe and Nantwich (promoted from Midlands 2 West (North))
Earlsdon (promoted from Midlands 2 West (South))
Hereford
Kenilworth
Leek (promoted from Midlands 2 West (North))
Newport (Salop) RFC (relegated from National League 3 Midlands)
Silhillians
Stoke-on-Trent	
Stratford Upon Avon 
Walsall
Whitchurch
Worcester Wanderers (relegated from National League 3 South West)

2013–14
Barkers Butts
Berkswell & Balsall
Burton
Hereford
Kenilworth (promoted from Midlands 2 West (South))
Lichfield
Malvern (relegated from National League 3 South West)
Market Bosworth (transferred from Midlands 1 East)
Old Laurentians
Silhillians (promoted from Midlands 2 West (North))
Stoke-on-Trent
Stratford Upon Avon
Walsall
Whitchurch

2012–13
Barkers Butts
Berkswell & Balsall
Burton
Camp Hill
Hereford (relegated from National League 3 Midlands)
Lichfield
Ludlow 
Northwich
Old Halesonians
Stoke-on-Trent (promoted from Midlands 2 West (North)
Stratford Upon Avon
Walsall
Whitchurch
Worcester Wanderers

2011–12
Bedworth
Bournville 
Burton (relegated from National League 3 Midlands)
Camp Hill
Dunlop
Kenilworth '''(relegated from National League 3 Midlands)
Lichfield
Ludlow
Old Halesonians RFC
Stratford Upon Avon
Sutton Coldfield
Walsall
Whitchurch
Worcester Wanderers

2010–11
Banbury
Bournville
Camp Hill
Dudley Kingswinford
Leamington
Lichfield
Nuneaton Old Edwardians
Old Halesonians
Old Laurentians
Stratford Upon Avon
Sutton Coldfield
Walsall
Whitchurch
Worcester Wanderers

Original teams
When league rugby began in 1987 this division (known as Midlands 2 West) contained the following teams:

Bromsgrove
Burton
Dixonians
Dudley Kingswinford
Evesham
Hereford
Leamington
Newbold-on-Avon
Sutton Coldfield
Tamworth
Worcester

Midlands 1 West honours

Midlands 2 West (1987–1992)
The original Midlands 2 West (along with its counterpart Midlands 2 East) was a tier 6 league with promotion to Midlands Premier and relegation to either North Midlands 1 or Staffordshire/Warwickshire.

Midlands 2 (1992–1993)
Restructuring of the Midlands leagues ahead of the 1992–93 season saw Midlands 2 West and Midlands 2 East combined in a single tier 6 division known as Midlands 2. Promotion continued to Midlands 1 while relegation was now to the newly introduced Midlands West 1.

Midlands 2 (1993–1996)
The top six teams from Midlands 1 and the top six from North 1 were combined to create National 5 North, meaning that Midlands 2 dropped to become a tier 7 league. Promotion and relegation continued to Midlands Premier and Midlands West 1.

Midlands 2 (1996–2000)
At the end of the 1995–96 season National 5 North was discontinued and Midlands 2 returned to being a tier 6 league. Promotion and relegation continued to Midlands Premier and Midlands West 1.

Midlands 2 West (2000–2009)
Restructuring ahead of the 2000–01 season saw Midlands 2 split back into two tier 6 regional leagues – Midlands 2 West and Midlands 2 East. Promotion continued to Midlands 1 while relegation was now to either Midlands 3 West (North) or Midlands 3 West (South) (both formerly part of Midlands West 1).

Midlands 1 West (2009–2022)
League restructuring by the RFU meant that Midlands 2 West and Midlands 2 East were renamed as Midlands 1 West and Midlands 1 East, with both leagues remaining at tier 6. Promotion was now to National League 3 Midlands (formerly Midlands 1) and relegation to either Midlands 2 West (North) or Midlands 2 West (South).

Promotion play-offs
From 2000–01 until 2018–19 there has been a play-off between the runners-up of Midlands 1 East and Midlands 1 West for the third and final promotion place to National League 3 Midlands. The team with the superior league record has home advantage in the tie. At the end of the 2018–19 season the Midlands 1 East teams have been the most successful with eleven wins to the Midlands 1 West teams eight; and the home team has won promotion on thirteen occasions compared to the away teams six.

Number of league titles

Burton (4)
Bromsgrove (4)
Malvern (3)
Dudley Kingswinford (2)
Lichfield (2)
Newport (Salop) (2)
Sutton Coldfield (2)
Banbury (1)
Bedford Athletic (1)
Bedworth (1)
Bridgnorth (1)
Broadstreet (1)
Camp Hill (1)
Hereford (1)
Kenilworth (1)
Leamington (1)
Leighton Buzzard (1)
Longton (1)
Old Halesonians (1)
Old Laurentians (1)
Scunthorpe (1)
Whitchurch (1)

Notes

See also
 Midlands RFU
 North Midlands RFU
 Staffordshire RU
 Warwickshire RFU
 English rugby union system
 Rugby union in England

References

 Rugby First: To view previous seasons in the league, search for any club within that league then click on to club details followed by fixtures and then select the appropriate season.

6
2
Recurring sporting events established in 1987
Sports leagues established in 1987